Amir Baitukanov (born 29 October 1989) is a Kazakhstani long-distance runner.

In 2018, he competed in the men's half marathon at the 2018 IAAF World Half Marathon Championships held in Valencia, Spain. He finished in 133rd place.

References

External links 
 

Living people
1989 births
Place of birth missing (living people)
Kazakhstani male long-distance runners